Engjëll Hoti (born 21 February 1998) is a Kosovan professional footballer who plays as a midfielder for Albanian club Partizani Tirana.

Club career

Trepça '89
On 1 February 2019, Hoti signed a one-year contract with Football Superleague of Kosovo club Trepça '89. Nine days later, he made his debut with Trepça '89 in the 2018–19 Kosovar Cup quarter-finals against Prishtina after being named in the starting line-up. Six days after debut, he made his league debut in a 2–0 away defeat against Ferizaj after being named in the starting line-up.

Llapi
On 10 August 2020, Hoti signed a one-year contract with Football Superleague of Kosovo club Llapi and received squad number 16. On 23 September 2020, he was named as a Llapi substitute for the first time in a league match against Gjilani. His debut with Llapi came seven days later in a 1–3 home win against Ballkani after being named in the starting line-up.

Tirana
On 22 July 2021, Hoti signed a two-year contract with Kategoria Superiore club Tirana, and received squad number 7. On 11 September 2021, he made his debut in a 4–2 home win against Skënderbeu Korçë after being named in the starting line-up.

International career

Under-21

Albania
On 21 January 2016, Hoti was named as part of the Albania U21 squad for 2016 Antalya Cup. His debut with Albania U21 came a day later in 2016 Antalya Cup match against Saudi Arabia U21. Six days after debut, Hoti scored his first goal for Albania U21 in his fourth appearance for the country in a 1–1 draw over Kosovo U21.

Kosovo
On 21 March 2017, Hoti received a call-up from Kosovo U21 for a 2019 UEFA European Under-21 Championship qualification match against Republic of Ireland U21, and made his debut after being named in the starting line-up.

Honours
Tirana
 Kategoria Superiore: 2021–22

References

External links

Living people
1997 births
Footballers from Stuttgart
Kosovan footballers
Kosovo under-21 international footballers
Kosovan expatriate footballers
Kosovan expatriate sportspeople in Albania
Albanian footballers
Albania under-21 international footballers
German footballers
German people of Kosovan descent
German people of Albanian descent
Association football midfielders
Regionalliga players
Eintracht Braunschweig II players
Oberliga (football) players
Rot Weiss Ahlen players
Football Superleague of Kosovo players
KF Trepça'89 players
KF Llapi players
Kategoria Superiore players
KF Tirana players
FK Partizani Tirana players